Alfort may refer to:

École nationale vétérinaire d'Alfort, school of veterinary medicine in Val-de-Marne, Île-de-France, France
Jardin botanique de l'École nationale vétérinaire d'Alfort, botanical garden operated by the École Nationale Vétérinaire
Musée Fragonard d'Alfort, museum of anatomical oddities located at within the École Nationale Vétérinaire
Alfort Smith (1846–1908), English cricketer
Maisons-Alfort, commune in the southeastern suburbs of Paris, France